Craig Huft is a retired American soccer player who played professionally in the American Professional Soccer League, National Professional Soccer League and Continental Indoor Soccer League.  He was 1992 USISL All League.

In 1986, Huft began his collegiate career at Ohlone College.  He then transferred to Cal State Hayward where he played from 1987 to 1989. In 1988, he was NCAC Second Team All-Conference and in 1989 he was NSCAA First Team All-West Region. He was also captain of the 1989 team that went to the NCAA Division II Final Four in Greensboro, North Carolina. In 1990, Huft turned professional with the Salt Lake Sting of the American Professional Soccer League.  In 1992, he played for the Palo Alto Firebirds in the USISL.  The Firebirds won the league championship and Huft was named First Team All League.  In November 1992, Huft signed with the Milwaukee Wave of the National Professional Soccer League.  On December 4, 1992, the Wave released Huft after he played only six games, scoring three goals.  In 1993, he signed with the Sacramento Knights of the Continental Indoor Soccer League.  Huft remained with the Knights until the team ceased operations in 2001.  Over Huft's nine seasons with the Knights, the team played in the Premier Soccer Alliance and the World Indoor Soccer League.

References

External links
 San Juan Soccer: Craig Huft

Living people
1966 births
American soccer players
American Professional Soccer League players
Continental Indoor Soccer League players
National Professional Soccer League (1984–2001) players
Palo Alto Firebirds players
Premier Soccer Alliance players
Sacramento Knights players
Salt Lake Sting players
USISL players
Milwaukee Wave players
World Indoor Soccer League players
Association football forwards